Obie Trice III (born November 14, 1977) is an American rapper. He was signed to fellow Detroit rapper Eminem's Shady Records in 2002, where he released the albums Cheers (2003) and Second Round's on Me (2006). Trice formed his own record label, Black Market Entertainment, upon leaving Shady. He does not use a rap name like most rappers, instead using his birth name on stage.

Biography 
Obie Trice III was born and raised on the west side of Detroit, Michigan, by his mother, along with three brothers. He is of African American and German descent. Trice was given a karaoke machine by his mother when he was eleven and he used it to rhyme over instrumentals from artists such as N.W.A. By the age of fourteen, he was attending rap battle gatherings around Detroit, including the Hip Hop Shop, where he and his friends would go on Saturday afternoons. The battles were hosted by Proof, from D12. Positive response from watchers encouraged Trice to get into rap music seriously."

Trice was calling himself "Obie 1" at that time, but before Proof introduced him at the Hip Hop Shop, he asked him his real name and introduced him as "Obie Trice", which remains his rap name. Trice was introduced to Eminem through D12 member Bizarre. Later, Trice's manager arranged for him to have dinner and go to a Kid Rock party with Eminem.

Career

Shady Records (2000–2002) 
Trice signed to Shady Records in 2000. He created a freestyle skit on the D12 album Devil's Night, following up with an intro snippet in Eminem's The Eminem Show lead single "Without Me", as well as the song "Drips". Later in 2002, Trice rapped on songs for the 8 Mile soundtrack, and also had a cameo appearance in the film as a rapper in a parking lot.

Cheers (2003–2004) 

Trice's debut album, Cheers, was released on September 23, 2003, with its first single "Got Some Teeth" being well received on radio in a number of countries. "Got Some Teeth” peaked at number 54 on the Billboard Hot 100, and peaked within the top ten of the charts in Belgium (Flanders), Denmark, Ireland, New Zealand, and the United Kingdom. In the latter country, "Got Some Teeth" debuted and peaked at number eight on the UK Singles Chart in October 2003. He also released the singles "The Set Up" and "Don't Come Down". The album consists of 17 tracks with production from Eminem, Dr. Dre, Timbaland, Mike Elizondo, Emile, Fredwreck and Mr. Porter. Artists featured on Cheers include Busta Rhymes, Eminem, 50 Cent, Lloyd Banks, Dr. Dre, Nate Dogg, D12, Tony Yayo, and Timbaland. The album was eventually certified platinum by the RIAA.
Trice also featured on the track Hennessey on Tupac Shakur's posthumous album Loyal To The Game.

Second Round's on Me and shooting (2005–2007) 

In 2005, Trice began work on his second album, entitled Second Round's on Me. The album was released on August 15, 2006. Following the release of Second Round's on Me, he released a mixtape called Bar Shots with G-Unit's DJ Whoo Kid.

Shortly after his label-mate Proof was shot to death in a Detroit nightclub, a song emerged on the mixtape circuit called "Ride Wit Me". The song was dedicated to Proof. Trice made a speech at Proof's funeral, addressing the problem of black-on-black violence:

In the single "Cry Now" from his second album, Trice addresses his shooting, as well as Eminem's rumored retirement, referenced with the following line, "Rock City is my voice / The white boy has stepped down / So I will accept the crown." Trice also addresses the shooting in the song "Pistol Pistol" from the album Eminem Presents: The Re-Up claiming he's after revenge, "I solemnly swear on my daughters tears/The nigga that got him in the head will feel it before the year ends / Hope you inconspicuous my friend / `Cause once the word get back ya in a world of sin / Bullets will hurtle at him for tryin to murder what been determined as the first solo African " and later "I'm so sincere you seein' a hearse this year / it's not a verse it's curse for burstin' what's on ya person". He has since given insight as to why he feels the shooting occurred, and has labeled it "haterism", as well as a bad mind state by saying, "it's a lot of do-or-die type individuals. They want to get that plug and there's really more to the game than they think it is [...] it's competition on a real vicious level."

Departure from Shady Records (2008–2009) 
In June 2008, Obie Trice departed from Shady Records due to concern that he was not being promoted properly. Contrary to public belief at the time of the announcement, Trice did not have a falling out with Eminem or Dr. Dre. Both contributed vocals and production to Trice's upcoming album. A misunderstanding was made where it was believed he was attacking the label and Eminem on a single titled "The Giant"; however, this was quickly dismissed.

Special Reserve (2009–2010) 
On December 15, 2009, a compilation album, Special Reserve, by Obie Trice and MoSS, the first producer of DJ Premier's "Works of Mart" production company, was released. The album is a collection of eleven of Trice's tracks recorded with MoSS from 1997 to 2000. The album served as a preface to his next album, Bottoms Up.

Move to Black Market Entertainment, Bottoms Up, The Hangover and The Fifth (2010–present) 

On April 22, 2010, "Rap Basement" reported that Obie Trice would launch his own independent music label, Black Market Entertainment, on May 7. The label would be owned by Universal. On May 4, he confirmed that Eminem would be a featured guest artist on his upcoming album, Bottoms Up. On August 24, 2010, he released a new  single, "My Time 2011", from Bottoms Up via myspace; the track is produced by Geno XO. The music video was released on March 22, 2011; footage for the video was filmed at the Black Market Ent. Launch Party.

On September 2, 2010, Trice announced that he would be hosting "The Black & White" concert after party, following the Eminem & Jay-Z Show at Comerica Park (held the same night), at the Goodnight Gracie's; the party goes from 9pm to 2am.

On April 5, 2011, another street single from Trice was released, called "Learn to Love". Although some of the lyrics were changed, it was just a remixed version of his song titled "Haters" from his "Bar Shots" mixtape.

On August 2, 2011, Obie Trice tweeted the release date for the album, October 25. The first official single, "Battle Cry" featuring Adrian Rezza, produced by Lucas Rezza was released on iTunes on August 23.

On April 3, 2012, Bottoms Up was released. On May 7, Trice released a new song from his upcoming mixtape The Hangover titled "Get Rich Die Tryin" featuring Bilal.

On August 1, 2012, in an interview with HipHopDX, Trice announced that he was working on an album that would also be also titled The Hangover, which features one of three tracks produced by Warren G, who suggested that Eminem should be featured on one of those tracks.

On June 15, 2015, Obie Trice released the first single "Good Girls" from  The Hangover, which was released on August 7. The track was produced by the Grammy award-winning producer Magnedo7, who was one of the producers of Eminem's seventh studio album, Recovery.

In a 2016 interview with Mr. Wavvy, Trice announced that he was already crafting his fifth studio album, which he planned to releasing later in the year. Additionally, he revealed plans of a box set that included all four of his previous studio albums, along with previously unreleased tour footage. On August 23, 2019, his fifth album simply named The Fifth was released. It includes guest appearances from Magnedo7, Directorkasper, Xzibit and others.

On December 10, 2019, Obie Trice released a diss track called "Spanky Hayes" against Nick Cannon to defend Eminem after Nick Cannon released two diss tracks against Eminem. In the diss track, Trice was rapping over the instrumental of "30 Something" by Jay-Z. On December 16, Trice released a second diss track against Cannon called "Spanky Hayes 2" and under original production by Dubmuzik, who has produced for Trice in the past. In the diss track, he also calls out Suge Knight for  calling  Cannon "the new 2Pac" on the latter's first diss track against Eminem.

Personal life

Shootings 
On December 31, 2005, Trice's car was shot six times and while driving on the Lodge Expressway by Wyoming Avenue in Detroit. One of the bullets hit him in the head. Trice was able to drive off the expressway, where his girlfriend waved down the police. He was taken to Providence Hospital and released later that day. Doctors contemplated whether or not to remove the bullet. As it was too dangerous to operate, the bullet is still lodged in his skull.

TMZ reported on December 6, 2019, that Trice was arrested for shooting his girlfriend's son. On July 8, 2020, Trice was sentenced to 90 days in the Oakland County Jail in Michigan from charges related to the shooting.

Meeting with Michigan State Senator 
On April 22, 2011, Trice met with Michigan State Senator Virgil Smith Jr. to discuss providing local artists with entertainment venues.

Michigan arrest 
On June 16, 2022, Trice was arrested and jailed after an arraignment in District Court in Bloomfield Hills, Michigan on a charge of using a telephone to harass or threaten someone. Soon after, he posted the $10,000 bond in the case.

Discography 

Studio albums
 Cheers (2003)
 Second Round's on Me (2006)
 Bottoms Up (2012)
 The Hangover (2015)
 The Fifth (2019)

Mixtapes
 The Bar Is Open (with DJ Green Lantern) (2003)
 Bar Shots (hosted by DJ Whoo Kid) (2006)
 The Most Under Rated (hosted by DJ Whoo Kid) (2007)
 Watch the Chrome (hosted by DJ Whoo Kid) (2012)

Compilation albums
 Special Reserve (with MoSS) (2009)

Collaboration albums
 Eminem Presents: The Re-Up  (with Shady Records) (2006)

References

External links 
Official Obie Trice website

1977 births
African-American male rappers
African-American Christians
American people of German descent
American shooting survivors
Living people
Midwest hip hop musicians
Rappers from Detroit
21st-century American rappers
21st-century American male musicians
21st-century African-American musicians
20th-century African-American people